Lily Niber-Lawrence (born 23 June 1997) is a Ghanaian footballer who plays as a midfielder for Spanish Primera Nacional club CD Juan Grande and the Ghana women's national team. She competed for Ghana at the 2018 Africa Women Cup of Nations, playing in one match.

References

1997 births
Living people
Women's association football midfielders
Ghanaian women's footballers
Ghana women's international footballers
Extremadura UD Femenino players
Ghanaian expatriate footballers
Ghanaian expatriate  sportspeople in Portugal
Expatriate women's footballers in Portugal
Ghanaian expatriate  sportspeople in Spain
Expatriate women's footballers in Spain
Ghanaian expatriate women's footballers
Hasaacas Ladies F.C.  players